Eucleides was archon of Athens towards the end of the fifth century BC. He contributed towards the re-establishment of democracy during his years in office (403–402 BC). He is also believed to have contributed to the new political order, with proposals that sought to deal with the challenge of the potentially disruptive minority who had supported oligarchy in the previous years.

Work 

During his archonship many Greek poleis changed their epichoric alphabet adopting the Ionic script. He supported a decree to change the alphabet and adopt Ionian script. Athenians accepted a spelling reform, adopting the Ionian alphabet, which included eta and omega. There are inscriptions from Athens which used Ionian spelling before it was official and others which continued to use the old Attic spelling after it was repudiated. Eucleides was involved in adoption of the new spelling form that was acceptable to Athenians. The reform meant that the old Attic alphabet traditionally used in all official documents had to be changed in order to conform to Ionic usage, which had become a standard alphabet for the Greeks.

Archinus, a political ally of Eucleides, was conspicuously involved in turbulent politics of Athens. It is believed that a decree on adoption of Ionic alphabets was based on political consideration rather than artistic or language development. However, during Eucleides's year as archon, Athenian experienced a spirited attempt to end the civil strife and the contemplation of a new constitution.

Success and legacy 

The credit for the success of the reconciliation during archonship of Eucleides is accorded to his most prominent political colleague, Archinus. He is further believed to have come up with the proposal to adopt Ionic alphabets that was decreed by Eucleides during his tenure as archon of Athens. Under the archonship of Eucleides, Athens was recovering from horror; it was threatened with extinction because of the attacks by Sparta and the Peloponnesian League

Prior to the archonship of Eucleides, Athens was humiliated and had no empire to finance its democratic structures due to persistent civil wars that had threatened to tear it apart. However, peace returned following the amnesty between the enemy parties and the plans of restoration were initiated under the leadership of Eucleides. Consequently, the clamour for alphabet reform could be traced to the end of the hostilities between democrats and oligarchs.

After the overthrow of the Thirty Tyrants, the new democratic government declared the year 403–402 BC under Eucleides as the inauguration of a new era of harmony. The amnesty, also referred as ‘acts of oblivion’, was designed to heal the wounds caused by the previous years' civil war.  The amnesty prevented the prosecution of those considered as political enemies through having supported the Thirty Tyrants. Conclusively, Eucleides supported political tolerance and it was said that he could not be corrupted or commit atrocities like those experienced during the reign of the Thirty Tyrants.

References

5th-century BC Athenians
5th-century BC births
4th-century BC deaths
Greek alphabet
Year of birth unknown
Place of birth unknown
Year of death unknown
Place of death unknown
Eponymous archons